Shirley Baptist Church may refer to one or more Baptist churches:

 Shirley Baptist Church, Southampton, UK
 Shirley Baptist Church, Solihull, UK